The RFU Championship XV is an invitational rugby union team composed of English qualified players from the second tier competition, the  RFU Championship. The team was originally formed for a one–off match against a strong Māori All Blacks team as part of the 2012 end-of-year rugby union tests. However, on 10 September 2014, it was announced that the team will be re-formed for an uncapped match against Canada for the 2014 end-of-year rugby union internationals.

The 2014 fixture will see Martin Haag, head coach of Nottingham, take over from Mike Rayer, Bedford Blues head coach, who led the XV side to a 52–21 loss in the Māori All Blacks fixture. On that occasion, the match was played on 17 November 2012 at Castle Park, as part of the 2012 Māori All Blacks tour of United Kingdom, where the Māori side won two from three matches; 24–32 loss to Leicester Tigers, 52–21 win over RFU Championship XV and finally a 32–19 win over the XV's next opponent Canada.

Squads

2014 Squad vs Canada
On 10 October, Martin Haag announced the first 21 players that would represent the team against Canada on 2 November.

On 16 October, James Phillips was added to the squad.

On 27 October, Haag added a further 2 players to the team, in Jonny Arr and Max Maidment.

1 It was later announced that Jonny Arr had replaced Ryan Glynn, who withdrew from the squad due to injury.

2 On 31 October, Kieran Hallett was added to the squad to replace Dan Mugford, who was forced to withdraw from the squad due to injury.

The final team to face Canada was announced on the 31 October.

Head coach:  Martin Haag

2012 Squad vs Māori All Blacks

Previous matches

Māori All Blacks (2012)

Coaches
 Mike Rayer (2012) - Assisted by Ian Davies
 Martin Haag (2014) - Assisted by Kevin Maggs

Captains
  Gavin Cattle (2012)

See also
 2012–13 RFU Championship
 2014–15 RFU Championship
 New Zealand Heartland XV

References

RFU Championship
Championshiph